"Ella Me Levantó", is a 2007 reggaeton single by Daddy Yankee. Known for its combination of the "reggaeton" and "merengue" genres, the song helps define the new subgenre of reggaeton and merengue, "merenguetón."

It was released after "Mensaje de Estado," and Yankee also performed the song at the Latin Grammy Awards in December 2007.

In the U.S., the song peaked at #2 on the Hot Latin Tracks chart.

Music video
The music video for Ella Me Levantó features Ayala in what appears to be a restaurant-club type setting. The video begins with people playing billiards, suddenly when Yankee starts performing the song. The video features multiple dancers in the club as Yankee performs the song on a stage. The main dancer for this video has also been featured in a number of other videos by Daddy Yankee.

Chart positions

References

2007 songs
Spanish-language songs
Daddy Yankee songs
Songs written by Daddy Yankee
Reggaeton songs